William Wilkins may refer to:

 William Wilkins (architect) (1778–1839), British architect and archaeologist
 William Wilkins (American politician) (1779–1865), American politician from Pennsylvania; served in both houses of Congress and as U.S. Secretary of War
 William Wilkins (educator) (1827–92), Australian teacher and co-founder of Fort Street High School
 William Glyde Wilkins (1854–1921), head of W.G. Wilkins Company, an architectural and engineering firm in Pittsburgh, Pennsylvania
 William Henry Wilkins (1860–1905), English writer
 William J. Wilkins (judge) (1897–1995), American lawyer and judge from the state of Washington
 William Wilkins (British politician) (1899–1987), British Labour Party MP for Bristol South, 1945–1970
 Willie Wilkin (1916–1973), American football player
 William J. Wilkins (architect) (died 1932), American architect who worked in the Carolinas
 William Walter Wilkins (born 1942), former United States federal judge
 Billy Wilkins (active from 1991), Christian musician with the band Third Day